Stage Door Cartoon is a 1944 Merrie Melodies cartoon directed by Friz Freleng. The short was released on December 30, 1944, and features Bugs Bunny and Elmer Fudd.

Plot
Elmer Fudd attempts to catch Bugs Bunny with a carrot on a fish hook, but Bugs attaches the hook to Elmer's pants and reels Elmer in. Then Elmer chases Bugs into a theater; Bugs disguises himself as a can-can dancer, but Elmer recognizes Bugs, and prevents him from exiting the stage. Bugs dances, then plays the piano where Elmer hides and gets bounced around. Bugs then tricks Elmer into high-diving into a glass of water. Elmer is then tricked into wearing a Shakesperean costume, then, prompted by Bugs, acts, then does poses and silly faces; Bugs prompts the booing audience to throw a tomato at Elmer.

Elmer is then tricked into performing a striptease down to his shorts. Bugs disguises himself as a southern sheriff while the real sheriff  arrests Elmer for "indecent southern exposure". But the sheriff stays for the Bugs Bunny cartoon on the movie screen. Elmer notices the scene with Bugs' disguise, thinks the sheriff is an impostor, and pulls off his pants — disrobing a real sheriff, who furiously escorts Elmer out of the theater with his rifle as Bugs conducts the orchestra in a finale.

Home media
 VHS: Viddy-Oh! For Kids Cartoon Festivals: Bugs Bunny and Elmer Fudd Cartoon Festival Featuring "Wabbit Twouble"
 VHS: Cartoon Moviestars: Bugs Vs. Elmer
 LaserDisc: The Golden Age of Looney Tunes, Volume 3, Side 2, Bugs Bunny
 DVD: Hollywood Canteen (USA 1995 Turner print added as a bonus)
 DVD: Looney Tunes Golden Collection: Volume 2, Disc 4
 DVD: Looney Tunes Spotlight Collection: Volume 2, Disc 2

Production notes
The cartoon's title is a parody of the 1943 musical film Stage Door Canteen.

This is the first cartoon to feature Bugs' signature song "What's Up Doc?" playing during the title card.

Bugs' goofy yell to Elmer, "Here I ya-um!" was a catchphrase used by radio star Red Skelton's country bumpkin character "Clem Kadiddlehopper".

The Southern sheriff in this cartoon is a prototype of Yosemite Sam, which was later confirmed in the ToonHeads episode "Before They Were Stars". This prototype version of Sam appears to be a little taller in height (almost as tall as Bugs), older in age (hence the white hair), and is a good guy who is a fan of Bugs and his cartoons, in contrast to the "official" Sam who is evil, hates rabbits (including Bugs), shorter in height and younger in age with red hair.

Bugs' final line, "I got a million of 'em!" was a Jimmy Durante catchphrase; Bugs also mimics Durante's standard body language while saying it.

This cartoon marks the debut of "Untitled Soft Shoe Number", an original music score by Carl Stalling. Portions of the foreground (character) animation layer from the scene of Bugs dancing to this music cue would later be re-used in Bugs Bunny Rides Again and Hot Cross Bunny (both 1948).

The basic plotline was re-used in the 1949 Bugs-and-Elmer cartoon, Hare Do and again in the 1950 Bugs-and-Elmer cartoon, Rabbit of Seville. A modified version of the high dive is used in Hare Do, where Bugs tricks a blindfolded Elmer into riding a unicycle from a wire high above a stage into the jaws of a man-eating lion, with the result having an ending reminiscent to the ending of A Day at the Zoo (1939), which featured Elmer's prototype Egghead being swallowed up by a lion.

The high-diving gag from this cartoon is later used as the entire plot device for High Diving Hare (1949), where Yosemite Sam tries to force Bugs Bunny to perform the high-diving act when Fearless Freep is unavailable.

The line Elmer is prompted by Bugs Bunny to recite is based upon Romeo and Juliet II.ii.2 (which is actually "But soft, what light through yonder window breaks?") Elmer, due to his speech impediment, cannot properly pronounce the line.

See also
 Looney Tunes and Merrie Melodies filmography (1940–1949)
 List of Bugs Bunny cartoons

References

Further reading

External links

 
 

1944 films
1944 short films
1944 animated films
1940s animated short films
Films scored by Carl Stalling
Films set in a theatre
Merrie Melodies short films
Short films directed by Friz Freleng
Warner Bros. Cartoons animated short films
Bugs Bunny films
Elmer Fudd films
1940s Warner Bros. animated short films
Films with screenplays by Michael Maltese